Line M1, officially referred to as the M1 Yenikapı–Atatürk Airport/Kirazlı metro line, also known as the Istanbul Light Metro, is a rapid transit line of the Istanbul Metro. Opened in 1989, it was the first rapid transit line in Istanbul and Turkey and its opening started the revival of mass-transit in Turkish cities.

The M1 consists of two train services, M1A and M1B. Both services run on the same line from Yenikapı to Otogar, where the M1B branches off to Kirazlı, while the M1A continues on the original line to Istanbul Atatürk Airport. Even though the M1 is fully grade separated, it is considered a light metro line, due to the relatively low passenger capacity compared to other lines of the system.

In November 2014, the long-awaited extension from Aksaray to Yenikapı was opened.

History 
With Istanbul's population growing and the city rapidly expanding outward, the bus service available in the city became insufficient in the 1970s and 1980s. At that time, the city did not have a mass transit rail system, except for a single  funicular line known as Tünel – the last operating original tramline was closed in 1969. Istanbul desperately needed a rapid transit rail system to help transport its large population.

The first segment of the M1 line began service on September 3, 1989, between Aksaray and Kocatepe. On December 18, 1989, the line was extended to Esenler, but at that time the Otogar (Intercity Bus Station) was omitted. The Otogar station, and the segment between Otogar and Zeytinburnu stations on the M1A branch line, was opened on January 31, 1994. Following this, the M1A segment between Zeytinburnu and Bakırköy stations was opened on July 3 of the same year. Further extensions of the M1A line, to Ataköy and then Yenibosna stations, were opened in July and August 1995, at which point the length of the line reached approximately 16 km. In 1999, a new M1A line station located between Ataköy and Bakırköy stations, the Bahçelievler station, opened. Finally, the M1A branch line was completed on December 20, 2002, when the extension to the World Trade Center and Atatürk Airport in Yeşilköy opened.

A rebuilt Esenler station opened on February 22, 2012. The extension of the M1B branch line from Esenler to Kirazlı opened on June 14, 2013.

The extension of the M1 line from Aksaray to Yenikapı was inaugurated on November 9, 2014, allowing connections with the M2 line and Marmaray commuter rail service, as well as İDO seabus service. Using the M2 and Marmaray, passenger may travel north of the Golden Horn to Taksim, Mecidiyeköy, Levent and Maslak as well as across the Bosphorus to Üsküdar and Kadıköy. İDO seabuses offer service to coastal districts of Istanbul as well as other cities and towns on the Sea of Marmara.

Operations and route

A total of 105 trainsets transport up to 400,000 passenger daily between the operation hours from 6:00 in the early morning to 0:00 in the midnight. The M1 line has a maximum headway of 2 ½ minutes during peak hours. All stations have covered seating.  A total of 135 escalators and 65 elevators make access to the stations easy for passengers.

M1A line
The trip between the termini stations, Yenikapı and Atatürk Airport, takes approximately 35 minutes. Daily, 169 trains run in each direction between the termini stations, with a peak-hour headway of 6 minutes.

On the M1A line, seven stations are built underground, nine are ground-level stations, and three are elevated. The stations are so structured that six of them have island platforms and eleven stations have side platforms. The connection station at Otogar in Esenler has two island platforms, which enable traffic on three tracks by the two different M1 branch lines.

M1B line
The trip between the termini stations, Yenikapı and Kirazlı, takes approximately 25 minutes. Daily, 168 trains run in each direction between the termini stations, with a peak-hour headway of 4 minutes.

On the M1B line, eight stations are built underground and five are ground-level stations. The stations are so structured that eight of them have island platforms and four stations have side platforms. The connection station at Otogar in Esenler has two island platforms, which enable traffic on three tracks by the two different M1 branch lines.

Stations

M1 trunk section (served by both the M1A and M1B lines)

M1A branch

M1B branch 

 a  extension to a new terminus station at Halkalı is under construction. It will add nine stations to the M1B branch, west of Kirazlı offering an interchange with both the Marmaray and M11 lines.

Rolling stock
Since this line is the oldest modern rail line in İstanbul, it has relatively old vehicles, produced by ABB in 1988. The vehicles reach a maximum speed of 80 km/h with an acceleration of 0.7 m/s2.

See also
 Istanbul modern tramways – Separate modern tramways (T1, T4 & T5) of Istanbul
 Istanbul nostalgic tramways – Two separate heritage tramways of Istanbul
 Trams in Istanbul – the first generation tramway network
 Marmaray
 Public transport in Istanbul – includes information on trams
 EsTram (Eskisehir)
 Antalya trams
 Kayseri tram (Kayseray)

References

External links

  

Istanbul Metro
Railway lines opened in 1989
Railway lines opened in 2007
Passenger rail transport in Turkey
Standard gauge railways in Turkey
1989 establishments in Turkey
2007 establishments in Turkey
Fatih
Bayrampaşa
Esenler
Bağcılar
Zeytinburnu
Bakırköy
Güngören
Bahçelievler
Airport rail links in Turkey